John Stephen (1771–1833) was appointed solicitor-general and judge of the Supreme Court of New South Wales in the Colony of New South Wales.

Career
Stephen built up a legal practice as an attorney and barrister in Basseterre, Saint Kitts and Nevis. Stephen returned to England, where he lost on some bad investments, so then returned to Basseterre, but was unable to re-establish his previously profitable practice. His nephew James Stephen, who was permanent under-secretary of state for the colonies, recommended Stephen for appointment in the Colony of New South Wales. He was appointed the first Solicitor General for New South Wales in 1824, serving until August 1825 when he was appointed an additional judge of the Supreme Court of New South Wales. Stephen resigned from the Supreme Court in December 1932 due to ill health and died on 21 December 1833, at Clareville, described as his country house, in what is now Belfield.

Family
Stephen was the son of James Stephen, from Aberdeen, Scotland, and Sibella Milner, of Poole, Dorsetshire. Stephen and his wife Mary Anne, née Pasmore, had six boys, and three girls. The Stephen family became a prominent legal dynasty in Australia. Of his sons, Sir Alfred served as Chief Justice of New South Wales, while Sidney served on the Supreme Court of New Zealand. His nephew James served on the Supreme Court of Victoria, while his grandson, Sir Henry and great grandson Edward served on the Supreme Court of New South Wales.

See also
List of judges of the Supreme Court of New South Wales

References

External links

John Stephen at FamilySearch
Colonial Secretary's papers 1822-1877, State Library of Queensland- includes digitised correspondence, petitions and letters written by Stephen to the Colonial Secretary of New South Wales

1771 births
1833 deaths
Judges of the Supreme Court of New South Wales
English emigrants to colonial Australia
People from Poole
English people of Scottish descent
Settlers of New South Wales